Atso Askonen (born February 20, 1970) is a Finnish retired professional ice hockey forward.

Askonen played five games for KooKoo during the 1989–90 SM-liiga season where he scored no points. He continued to play with KooKoo in the 1. Divisioona until 1996.

After retiring in 2002, Askonen returned to KooKoo as head coach of their Jr. C and Jr. B teams. He later became an assistant coach for Pelicans' Jr. B team.

References

External links

1970 births
Living people
Finnish ice hockey forwards
Imatran Ketterä players
KooKoo players
People from Kouvola
Sportspeople from Kymenlaakso